The Athanasian Creed — also called the Pseudo-Athanasian Creed or Quicunque Vult (or Quicumque Vult), which is both its Latin name and its opening words, meaning "Whosoever wishes" — is a Christian statement of belief focused on Trinitarian doctrine and Christology. Used by Christian churches since the early sixth century, it was the first creed to  explicitly state the equality of the three hypostases of the Trinity. It differs from the Nicene-Constantinopolitan Creed and the Apostles' Creed in that it includes anathemas condemning those who disagree with its statements (as does the original Nicene Creed).

Widely accepted in Western Christianity, including by the Roman Catholic Church, some Anglican and Lutheran churches (it is part of the Lutheran confessions set out in the Book of Concord), and ancient liturgical churches, the Athanasian Creed over time has been used in public worship less and less frequently. However, part of it can be found as an "Authorized Affirmation of Faith" in the main volume of the Common Worship liturgy of the Church of England published in 2000. 

Designed to distinguish Nicene Christianity from the heresy of Arianism, the Athanasian Creed traditionally was recited at the Sunday Office of Prime in the Western Church. It has not been commonly used in the Eastern Church.

Origin 

A medieval account credited Athanasius of Alexandria, the famous defender of Nicene theology, as the author of the Creed. According to that account, Athanasius composed it during his exile in Rome and presented it to Pope Julius I as a witness to his orthodoxy. The traditional attribution of the Creed to Athanasius was first called into question in 1642 by the Dutch Protestant theologian Gerhard Johann Vossius. 

It has since been widely accepted by modern scholars that the creed was not authored by Athanasius, that it was not originally called a creed at all and that Athanasius's name was not originally attached to it. Athanasius's name seems to have become attached to the creed as a sign of its strong declaration of Trinitarian faith. The reasoning for rejecting Athanasius as the author usually relies on a combination of the following:

 The creed originally was most likely written in Latin, but Athanasius composed in Greek.
 Neither Athanasius nor his contemporaries ever mention the Creed.
 It is not mentioned in any records of the ecumenical councils.
 It appears to address theological concerns that developed after Athanasius died (including the filioque).
 It was most widely circulated among Western Christians.

The use of the creed in a sermon by Caesarius of Arles, as well as a theological resemblance to works by Vincent of Lérins, point to Southern Gaul as its origin. The most likely time frame is in the late fifth or early sixth century AD, at least 100 years after Athanasius lived. The Christian theology of the creed is firmly rooted in the Augustinian tradition and uses the exact terminology of Augustine's On the Trinity (published 415 AD). In the late 19th century, there was a great deal of speculation about who might have authored the creed, with suggestions including Ambrose of Milan, Venantius Fortunatus and Hilary of Poitiers. 

The 1940 discovery of a lost work by Vincent of Lérins, which bears a striking similarity to much of the language of the Athanasian Creed, has led many to conclude that the creed originated with Vincent or his students. For example, in the authoritative modern monograph about the creed, J. N. D. Kelly asserts that Vincent of Lérins was not its author but that it may have come from the same milieu, the area of Lérins in southern Gaul.

The oldest surviving manuscripts of the Athanasian Creed date from the late 8th century.

Content 

The Athanasian Creed is usually divided into two sections: lines 1–28 address the doctrine of the Trinity, and lines 29–44 address the doctrine of Christology. Enumerating the three persons of the Trinity (Father, the Son, and the Holy Spirit), the first section of the creed ascribes the divine attributes to each individually. Thus, each person of the Trinity is described as uncreated (increatus), limitless (Immensus), eternal (æternus), and omnipotent (omnipotens). 

While ascribing the divine attributes and divinity to each person of the Trinity, thus avoiding subordinationism, the first half of the Athanasian Creed also stresses the unity of the three persons in the one Godhead, thus avoiding a theology of tritheism. 

The text of the Athanasian Creed is as follows:

The Christology of the second section is more detailed than that of the Nicene Creed and reflects the teaching of the First Council of Ephesus (431) and the definition of the Council of Chalcedon (451). The Athanasian Creed uses the term substantia (a Latin translation of the Nicene homoousios: 'same being' or 'consubstantial') with respect to the relation of the Son to the Father according to his divine nature, but it also says that the Son is substantia of his mother Mary according to his human nature.

The Creed's wording thus excludes not only Sabellianism and Arianism but also the Christological heresies of Nestorianism and Eutychianism. A need for a clear confession against Arianism arose in Western Europe when the Ostrogoths and Visigoths, who had Arian beliefs, invaded at the beginning of the 5th century.

The final section of this Creed also moved beyond the Nicene (and Apostles') Creeds in making negative statements about the people's fate: "They that have done good shall go into life everlasting: and they that have done evil into everlasting fire." That caused considerable debate in England in the mid-19th century, centred on the teaching of Frederick Denison Maurice.

Uses 

Composed of 44 rhythmic lines, the Athanasian Creed appears to have been intended as a liturgical document, the original purpose of the creed being for it to be spoken or sung as a part of worship. The creed itself uses the language of public worship by speaking of the worship of God rather than the language of belief ("Now this is the catholic faith: We worship one God"). In the mediaeval Catholic Church, the creed was recited following the Sunday sermon or at the Sunday Office of Prime. The creed was often set to music and used in the place of a Psalm.

Protestantism 
Early Protestants inherited the late medieval devotion to the Athanasian Creed, and it was considered to be authoritative in many Protestant churches. The statements of Protestant belief (confessional documents) of various Reformers commend the Athanasian Creed to their followers, including the Augsburg Confession, the Formula of Concord, the Second Helvetic Confession, the Belgic Confession, the Bohemian Confession and the Thirty-nine Articles.  A metric version, "Quicumque vult", with a musical setting, was published in The Whole Booke of Psalmes printed by John Day in 1562. Among modern Lutheran and Reformed churches adherence to the Athanasian Creed is prescribed by the earlier confessional documents, but the creed does not receive much attention outside occasional use, especially on Trinity Sunday.

In Reformed circles, it is included, for example, in the Christian Reformed Churches of Australia's Book of Forms (published in 1991). However, it is rarely recited in public worship. It is sometimes recited by the Canadian Reformed Churches in the worship service.It is recited and used in the Protestant Reformed Churches. The Four additional ancient creeds  that they adhere to would be Apostles, Athanasian, Creed of Chalcedon, Nicene Creed. 

In the successive Books of Common Prayer of the reformed Church of England, from 1549 to 1662, its recitation was provided for on 19 occasions each year, a practice that continued until the 19th century, when vigorous controversy regarding its statement about 'eternal damnation' saw its use gradually decline. It remains one of the three Creeds approved in the Thirty-Nine Articles, and it is printed in several current Anglican prayer books, such as A Prayer Book for Australia (1995). As with Roman Catholic practice, its use is now generally only on Trinity Sunday or its octave. An Anglican devotional manual published by The Church Union, A Manual of Catholic Devotion: For Members of the Church of England, includes the Athanasian Creed with the prayers for Mattins, with the note: "Said on certain feasts at Mattins instead of the Apostles' Creed". The Episcopal Church, based in the United States, has never provided for its use in worship, but added it to its Book of Common Prayer for the first time in 1979, where it is included in small print in a reference section, "Historical Documents of the Church".  The Anglo-Catholic devotional manual Saint Augustine's Prayer Book, first published in 1947 and revised in 1967, includes the Athanasian Creed under "Devotions to the Holy Trinity".

Lutheranism 
In Lutheranism, the Athanasian Creed is, along with the Apostles' and the Nicene Creed, one of the three ecumenical creeds and is placed at the beginning of the 1580 Book of Concord, the historic collection of authoritative doctrinal statements (confessions) of the Lutheran Church. It is still used in the liturgy on Trinity Sunday.

Catholicism 
In Roman Catholic churches, it was traditionally said at Prime on Sundays when the Office was of the Sunday. The 1911 reforms reduced that to Sundays after Epiphany and Pentecost and on Trinity Sunday, except when a commemoration of a double feast or a day within an Octave occurred. The 1960 reforms further reduced its use to once a year, on Trinity Sunday. It has been effectively dropped from the Catholic liturgy since the Second Vatican Council. It is, however, maintained in the rite of exorcism of the Roman Rite. Opus Dei members recite it on the third Sunday of every month.

A common visualization of the first half of the Creed is the Shield of the Trinity.

References

Citations

Sources 

 
 
 
 
 
 
 
 
 
 
 
 
 
 
 
 
 
 
 
 
 
 

Book of Concord
Ecumenical creeds
5th-century Christian texts
Latin texts
Trinitarianism
Christian statements of faith
Christian terminology
Western Christianity
Nature of Jesus Christ